HMCS Nipigon was an  that served in the Royal Canadian Navy and later the Canadian Forces. She was the second Canadian naval unit to carry this name. Entering service in 1964, she was named for the Nipigon River that flows through Ontario.

Nipigon served throughout the Cold War on the Atlantic coast of Canada. She was paid off in 1998 and sold for use as an artificial reef off the coast of Quebec.

Design and description

Initially, the ships displaced  and had a complement of 228.

The ships were powered by two Babcock & Wilcox boilers connected to the two-shaft English-Electric geared steam turbines providing .

The ships were initially armed with two /50 caliber dual-purpose guns mounted in a single turret forward. The extra topweight of the helicopter required the return of the American Mk 33 3-inch gun over the heavier 3-inch/70 caliber guns used on the preceding class. The guns could fire 45 – 50 rounds per minute with a lifespan of 2,050 rounds. The guns were placed in a Mk 33 mount. The mounting allowed the guns to elevate from −15° to 85°. The elevation rate was 30° per second and train rate was 24° per second. The mounts could train 360°.

For anti-submarine warfare, the ships were armed with a Mk 10 Limbo mortar. Placed on stabilized mountings, the projectiles always entered the water at the same angle. They also had a Mk.4 thrower with homing torpedoes.

Initially the ships were outfitted with one SPS-12 air search radar, one SPS-10B surface search radar, and one Sperry Mk.2 navigation radar. For sensing below the surface, the class was given one SQS-501 high frequency bottom profiler sonar, one SQS-502 high frequency mortar control sonar, one SQS-503 hull mounted active search sonar and one SQS-504 VDS medium frequency active search sonar. For fire control purposes they were given one Mk 64 GFCS fire control with SPG-48 tracker (GUNAR).

The two Annapolis-class destroyers were built late enough to incorporate the helicopter hangar retrofitted to the St. Laurent class and the "Beartrap" haul-down device. This allowed the destroyer escorts to deploy with one CH-124 Sea King helicopter.

DELEX refit
The DEstroyer Life EXtension (DELEX) refit was born out of the need to extend the life of the steam-powered destroyer escorts of the Canadian Navy in the 1980s until the next generation of surface ship was built. Encompassing all the classes based on the initial St. Laurent (the remaining St. Laurent, Mackenzie, and Annapolis-class vessels), the DELEX upgrades were meant to improve their ability to combat modern Soviet submarines, and to allow them to continue to operate as part of NATO task forces.

The Annapolis class received the same sensor and communications upgrades that others in the St Laurent family of ships received, including the installation of a new tactical data system (ADLIPS), updated radars and sonars, fire control and satellite navigation. They also received the new Canadian Tactical Towed Array Sensor or CANTASS which was a long-range towed sonar array that was affixed to the stern, which replaced the older VDS. The class also received a new lattice mast.

They were given  torpedo tubes to allow them to fire Mark 46 torpedoes. However, the Limbo mortar was removed in order to install the CANTASS. This visibly altered the overall appearance of the ships.

Construction and career

Nipigon was ordered in 1958, initially as a repeat Restigouche-class vessel. However, in 1959, the last two repeat Restigouches were altered to incorporate variable depth sonar and a helicopter landing area and became a separate class. The ship was laid down on 5 August 1960 by Marine Industries Ltd. at Sorel and launched on 10 December 1961. She was commissioned into the Royal Canadian Navy on 30 May 1964 with classification number 266 and with the wife of the then Governor-General Georges Vanier, Madame Pauline Vanier, as her sponsor. She was actually the first vessel to commission in the class. In 1964, the ship escorted the royal yacht  on its tour of Canada.

On 18 October 1965, a fire broke out in the fuel-handling room, killing one and seriously injuring others.

Nipigon served most of her career with the RCN and later Canadian Forces' Atlantic Fleet. During her service with Maritime Forces Atlantic (MARLANT), she was primarily used as a training ship. However, no cracks were discovered in Nipigon. In 1982, Nipigon was tasked with searching for and recovering any survivors from Ocean Ranger, a semi-submersible oil platform that had sunk in heavy seas. Nipigons DELEX refit was performed by Davie Shipbuilding at Lauzon, taking place from 27 June 1983 to 22 August 1984 and cost $16 million.

On 28 April 1985, the warship shelled and sank the fishing trawler Lady Marjorie after it had been abandoned by its crew and became a hazard to navigation. Initially the decision was questioned, but Nipigon was later cleared by a Canadian Coast Guard report. In June 1985, Nipigon, while participating in naval exercises, suffered structural damage after a  stress crack sheared 215 rivets in the vessel's superstructure. The problem was not resolved until 1986. On 27 February 1987, her CH-124 helicopter rescued crewmen from the tug Gulf Gale which had caught fire off Cabo Rojo, Puerto Rico. The ship became the second to have a mixed-gender crew in the Canadian Forces in September 1987.

Nipigon underwent another refit, this time at Port Weller, Ontario beginning on 30 August 1988 and lasting to 16 February 1990. In August 1991, the destroyer was deployed to STANAVFORLANT, the standing NATO fleet. In May 1993, Nipigon took part in commemorative events remembering the Battle of the Atlantic in Liverpool and off the Welsh coast. In 1995, Nipigon was deployed into the Atlantic as a guard ship during the Turbot War. In June 1995, the destroyer intercepted the Spanish fishing vessel Patricia Nores, and boarded her just outside Canada's exclusive economic zone. Eleven tonnes of unrecorded turbot catch was found aboard Patricia Nores in a secret compartment.

She was decommissioned from the Canadian Forces on 2 July 1998 and sold for use as an artificial reef. She was sunk in the St. Lawrence River north-east of Rimouski, Quebec on 22 July 2003.

References

Notes

Citations

Sources

External links

HMCS Nipigon Artificial Reef, Rimouski Quebec Canada
Nipigon on Scubapedia

 

Annapolis-class destroyers
Cold War destroyers of Canada
1961 ships
Wreck diving sites